Hawk Creek is a stream in the U.S. state of Washington. It is a tributary of Columbia River.

Hawk Creek derives its name from on Mr. Hawkins, a local pioneer.

See also
List of rivers of Washington

References

Rivers of Lincoln County, Washington
Rivers of Washington (state)